The American Association for Respiratory Care (AARC) is a non profit organization and is the only professional organization supporting Respiratory Care in the United States. In addition to attempting to help lobby for beneficial legislation nationally and locally, the AARC is trying to promote the profession as a whole to increase interest and membership. The AARC began in 1943, as the Inhalation Technician Association and has evolved rapidly and repeatedly since.

Mission 
"The American Association for Respiratory Care (AARC) will continue to be the leading national and international professional association for respiratory care. The AARC will encourage and promote professional excellence, advance the science and practice of respiratory care, and serve as an advocate for patients, their families, the public, the profession and the respiratory therapist."

Publications 

 Respiratory Care
 AARC Times Magazine

Former titles
The AAIT began publishing a journal called Inhalation Therapy in 1956.

History

The University of Chicago Hospital forms the Inhalation Therapy Association (ITA) in 1946 and in 1947 the ITA is chartered as a non-profit entity in the state of Illinois.
The ITA was renamed American Association of Inhalation Therapists (AAIT) in 1954, and changed its name again in 1966 to  American Association of Inhalation Therapy (still AAIT).
The AAIT was renamed the American Association of Respiratory Therapy (AART) in 1973 and finally took the current name of American Association of Respiratory Care in 1986.

Affiliations

The AARC has several organizations with which they have an affiliation; some of these include:

AMA Allied Health Careers 
American Academy of Allergy, Asthma & Immunology 
American Academy of Pediatrics 
American Association of Cardiovascular and Pulmonary Rehabilitation 
American Association of Critical-Care Nurses 
American College of Allergy, Asthma & Immunology 
American Heart Association 
American Hospital Association
American Society of Anesthesiologists 
American Society for Testing and Materials 
American Thoracic Society 
Campaign for Tobacco-Free kids 
Canadian Society of Respiratory Therapists 
COARC, The Committee on Accreditation for Respiratory Care 
Council on Licensure, Enforcement, and Regulation 
Joint Commission on Accreditation of Healthcare Organizations 
Lambda Beta Society
National Association for Medical Direction of Respiratory Care 
National Association for the Support of Long Term Care 
National Board for Respiratory Care 
National Coalition for Health Professional Education in Genetics 
National Committee for Clinical Laboratory Standards 
National Lung Health Education Program 
Neonatal Resuscitation Program 
Respiratory Therapy Society of Ontario 
Society of Critical Care Medicine

See also 
European Sleep Apnea Database
National Board for Respiratory Care
Commission on Accreditation for Respiratory Care

References

Additional sources
"American Association for Respiratory Care International Respiratory Congress," 17 December 2012, in Sleep Review online, at https://web.archive.org/web/20131029205057/http://www.sleepreviewmag.com/continuing-education/18224-american-association-for-respiratory-care-international-respiratory-congress .
Greg Spratt, BS, RRT, CPFT, "Respiratory Care Departments Take a Lead Role in Postoperative Monitoring," 11 July 2012, in RT online, at https://web.archive.org/web/20131029203813/http://www.rtmagazine.com/all-news/16820-respiratory-care-departments-take-a-lead-role-in-postoperative-monitoring .
Cathy Rozansky, MSH, RRT, "Educating Health Professionals with Simulation Programs: Implications for Respiratory Therapists," 3 May 2012, in RT online, at  https://archive.today/20131027100206/http://www.rtmagazine.com/all-news/16804-educating-health-professionals-with-simulation-programs-implications-for-respiratory-therapists .
"AARC Urges EPA Go Forward with Planned Epinephrine Phase Out," 6 December 2011, in RT online, at https://web.archive.org/web/20131029203256/http://www.rtmagazine.com/all-news/18361-aarc-urges-epa-go-forward-with-planned-epinephrine-phase-out- . 
"AARC Releases Audio Book for Oxygen Users," October 31, 2012, in Advance for Respiratory Care & Sleep Medicine online, at http://respiratory-care-sleep-medicine.advanceweb.com/News/Daily-News-Watch/AARC-Releases-Audio-Book-for-Oxygen-Users.aspx .

External links 
 American Association of Respiratory Care
 National Board of Respiratory Care, Inc.

Medical associations based in the United States
Pulmonology and respiratory therapy organizations
Companies based in Irving, Texas
Non-profit organizations based in Texas